Connor McMichael (born January 15, 2001) is a Canadian professional ice hockey centre currently playing for the Hershey Bears in the American Hockey League (AHL) as a prospect to the Washington Capitals of the National Hockey League (NHL).  He was selected by the Capitals with the 25th overall pick in the 2019 NHL Entry Draft.

Playing career

Junior

Hamilton Bulldogs (2017–18)
McMichael was drafted by the Hamilton Bulldogs in the first round, eleventh overall, during the 2017 OHL Priority Draft. McMichael made his debut with the Bulldogs on September 23, 2017, and he was held to no points in a 4–1 loss to the Niagara IceDogs. Two games later, on September 29, McMichael earned his first career OHL point, an assist on a goal by Isaac Nurse in a 2–0 win over the Mississauga Steelheads. McMichael would have to wait until his 24th career game to score his first goal, as he scored against Cameron Lamour of the Saginaw Spirit in a 7–1 victory on December 9. On December 17, McMichael scored a goal and an assist for his first career multi-point game in a 5–2 win over the Peterborough Petes. On January 8, 2018, the Bulldogs traded McMichael to the London Knights for Robert Thomas and five draft picks. In 32 games with the Bulldogs during the 2017–18 season, McMichael scored five goals and 10 points.

London Knights (2018–2020)
McMichael finished his rookie season in the OHL with the London Knights. He made his debut with the Knights on January 11, 2018, and he was held to no points in a 5–1 loss to the Kitchener Rangers. McMichael scored his first goal with London on January 14 against Luke Richardson in a 2–1 win over the Rangers. In 28 games with the Knights, McMichael scored three goals and six points. On March 22, McMichael played in his first career OHL playoff game, and he had no points in a 5–4 loss to the Owen Sound Attack. In four playoff games, McMichael had no points.

McMichael saw his offensive production increase dramatically during the 2018–19 season. In his first game of the season on September 21, McMichael had his first career multi-goal game in his OHL career, scoring two goals and adding an assist in a 5–2 win over the Windsor Spitfires. On November 30, McMichael scored his first career OHL hat trick, scoring three goals against Daniel Murphy in an 8–1 win over the Erie Otters. One week later, on December 7, McMichael recorded his first career four point game, scoring two goals and adding two assists in an 8–1 win over the Kingston Frontenacs. Nine days later, on December 16, McMichael had another four point game in a 5–3 win over the Otters. McMichael finished the regular season leading the Knights with 36 goals and 72 points. On March 24, McMichael scored his first career post-season goal, scoring against Colton Incze of the Windsor Spitfires in a 5–0 victory. On April 7, McMichael had his first career multi-point game in the post-season, earning two assists in a 7–0 victory against the Guelph Storm. In 11 playoff games, McMichael scored two goals and five points.

McMichael was drafted by the Washington Capitals in the first round, 25th overall at the 2019 NHL Entry Draft held in Vancouver, British Columbia. On July 13, 2019, McMichael was signed to a three-year, entry-level contract with the Capitals.

Professional

Washington Capitals (2021–present)
McMichael made his NHL debut on January 24, 2021, against the Buffalo Sabres. That would be the only game he would play in during the 2020–21 NHL season as he was sent down to the Capitals' AHL affiliate, the Hershey Bears for the remainder of the season. However, McMichael would make the Capitals 2021–22 roster out of training camp. He scored his first NHL goal against the Florida Panthers on November 4, 2021.

Career statistics

Regular season and playoffs

International

Awards and honours

References

External links
 

2001 births
Living people
Canadian ice hockey centres
Hamilton Bulldogs (OHL) players
Hershey Bears players
Ice hockey people from Ontario
London Knights players
National Hockey League first-round draft picks
People from Ajax, Ontario
Washington Capitals draft picks
Washington Capitals players